Mike Babul (born November 25, 1977) is an American basketball coach who is currently the head coach of the South Shore Monarchs of The Basketball League. Before turning to coaching, he played college basketball for UMass from 1996 to 2000.

Playing career
Babul attended North Attleboro High School in North Attleboro, Massachusetts. In 1995, Babul chose to play for UMass over UConn where he was a four-year letter winner and three-year starter from 1996 to 2000. During his stay with UMass, he was selected to three A-10 Conference All-Defensive and All-Academic Teams.

Coaching career
He joined the Wagner Seahawks in 2012 and in 2014 was named the Associate Head Coach.  
On September 20, 2019, he was named the assistant coach of the Nets' NBA G League affiliate, the Long Island Nets. A  position he continued the following season.

Personal life
Babul's twin brother, Jon Babul, played college basketball for Georgia Tech.

References

External links
 College statistics
 UMass Minutemen bio

 
1977 births
Living people
American men's basketball coaches
American men's basketball players
Basketball coaches from Massachusetts
Basketball players from Massachusetts
Drexel Dragons men's basketball coaches
Forwards (basketball)
High school basketball coaches in Massachusetts
Long Island Nets coaches
UMass Minutemen basketball players
Wagner Seahawks men's basketball coaches
Youngstown State Penguins men's basketball coaches